Louis Dupré (Versailles 9 January 1789 – 12 October 1837 Paris) was a French painter, especially noted for his travels in Greece and other regions within the Ottoman Empire and of his numerous paintings with Orientalist and Philhellene themes.

Louis Dupré had been a student of Jacques-Louis David, and had later become a painter for Jérôme Bonaparte, receiving commissions from the court. Dupré had studied in Italy and had also received commissions during his travels there. He travelled to Greece, during a time when the region's ancient ideals and Hellenistic culture had experienced a revival. It also represented a concerning time for the Ottoman Empire, in terms of keeping their territorial regions under control. His visit to Greece was on the very eve of the Greek War of Independence.

He often traveled and changed his work location, including Paris, Kassel (1811–1814), Naples (1814–1816), Rome (1816–1819, 1824–1831), Naples (1819–1820),
Istanbul (c. 1820), Greece (c. 1820), Paris (1820–1837), and Vienna (1820–1824).

Travel book 
Dupré visited Greece in 1819, while it was still part of the Ottoman Empire, and recorded his time there with drawings and descriptions of the people from the different levels of society. His travel book, named Voyage à Athènes et à Constantinople, was produced a few years later after his travels, in 1825. It was released in France after Greece had begun to rebel against the Ottoman Empire. His travel book consists of forty illustrations accompanied by fifty-two pages of text.

Gallery

Bibliography 
Elisabeth A. Fraser, "Skin of Nation, Body of Empire: Louis Dupré in Ottoman Greece," in Mediterranean Encounters: Artists Between Europe and the Ottoman Empire, 1774-1839, Penn State University Press, 2017.

References

1789 births
1837 deaths
19th-century French painters
French male painters
French philhellenes
Orientalist painters
19th-century French male artists